Juan Manuel Ugarte Eléspuru (1911–2004) was a Peruvian painter, writer and historian.

Writers from Lima
1911 births
2004 deaths
20th-century Peruvian historians
Peruvian male writers
20th-century Peruvian painters
20th-century Peruvian male artists
20th-century male writers
Peruvian male painters